GayLib is an LGBT liberal political faction affiliated with the Radical Party (formerly Radical Movement). It was formerly affiliated with the French political party Union for a Popular Movement from its inception in 2002 to 2013 and to the Union of Democrats and Independents from 2013 to 2018. Its president is Emmanuel Blanc.

History
The creation of GayLib was supported by Jean-Pierre Raffarin, Philippe Douste-Blazy, Alain Juppé, and François Baroin. In 2002, its members took part in the pride parade in Paris for the first time.

Since 2007, they have been waylaid by The Pink Panthers, ACT UP and AIDES because of the UMP's repudiation of same-sex marriage. However, GayLib says that the UMP helped toughen up hate-crime laws, improved the PACS, created the HALDE, and had a foreign-policy stance against homosexuality criminalization through Rama Yade's appeal to the United Nations.

In January 2013, it rescinded its affiliation with the UMP because of the party's opposition to same-sex marriage. It later affiliated with the Union of Democrats and Independents (UDI), whose president Jean-Louis Borloo endorsed same-sex marriage.  

In 2018 GayLib severed its ties with UDI and joined the Radical Movement (MR). Following the dissolution of MR, GayLib became the official LGBT wing of the revived Radical Party (PR).

See also
Homosexualités et Socialisme, the Socialist Party-affiliated equivalent

References

External links
Official website
Official blog

LGBT conservatism
LGBT liberalism
LGBT political advocacy groups in France
Factions and associate parties of the Union for a Popular Movement
LGBT affiliate organizations of political parties
2002 establishments in France